Perumizhalai Kurumba Nayanar is the 22nd of 63 Nayanar saints of Hinduism. Traditional hagiographies like Periya Puranam (13th century CE) and Thiruthondar Thogai (10th century CE) describe him as a great devotee of the Hindu god Shiva. He was a follower of another Nayanar, Sundarar.

Hagiographical account

Perumizhalai Kurumba Nayanar was born in Perumizhalai village that was also known as Perumanallur and Devamalai, located in Pudukottai district, Tamil Nadu) in a Kurumba shepherd tribal community. The Kurumba community people were engaged in rearing of Kurumba sheep and weaving their wool into coarse shawl. Sundarar has casually mentioned about Perumizhalai, in his Vaippu Sthalangal i.e., places that were mentioned casually in the devotional songs, in Tevaram. The Guru Pooja of Perumizhalai Kurumba Nayanar is celebrated every year in his home town.

Perumizhalai Kurumba Nayanar was a chieftain who governed the Perumizhalai region. The saint used to pack sufficient food and other articles in a woolen Kambli and forward them from the border of the region. The Nayanar was noted for his simple nature and austerity by the people. The saint spent his life with great devotion and faith.

Perumizhalai Kurumba Nayanar was a contemporary with Sundarar, the Chera King Cheraman Perumal and Kotpuli Nayanar who also figure in the 63 Nayanars. Kurumba Nayanar was the admirer of Sundarar and accepted him as his guru. The saint enjoyed in chanting Panchakshara as well as the hymns of Thiruthonda Pathikam. Thiruthonda Pathikam is part of Thiruthonda Thogai composed by Sundarar in praise of 63 Nayanars at Tiruvarur temple. Over a period time Kurumba Nayanar attained Ashta-siddhis, eight yogic powers.

Sundarar proceeded to the sacred land Thiruvanchikulam as a spiritual journey. Using his siddhis, Kurumba Nayanar learned that Shiva had decided to recall Sundarar to His divine abode, granting Sundarar salvation. As the troubled Kurumba Nayanar felt that he could not live without his beloved guru, he left his mortal body with his powers and attained the abode of Shiva, before his guru.

Tamil month Adi – Chithirai star is widely celebrated as Guru Puja Day of Kurumba Nayanar.

1500 வருடங்களுக்கு முன்பு புதுக்கோட்டை மாவட்டத்திலுள்ள குடுமியான்மலை மன்னனாக இருந்தார்.
இவரின் குடும்பத் தொழிலாக ஆடு மேய்த்தல் இருந்தது.இவரின் பெயரில் உள்ள குறும்பா என்பது இந்து சமயத்திலுள்ள ஒரு சாதியின் பெயர் ஆகும்.அவர் குலத்தை சேர்ந்தவர்கள் வளர்த்த ஆடுகள் குறும்பாடு என்று அழைக்கப்படுகிறது

References

Nayanars